The dollar or dala was the currency of Hawaii between 1847 and 1898. It was equal to the United States dollar and was divided into 100 cents or keneta. Only sporadic issues were made, which circulated alongside United States currency.

Coins
The first official coinage issued by the Kingdom of Hawai'i was in 1847. This coin was a copper cent bearing the portrait of King Kamehameha III on its obverse. The King Kamehameha III copper cent proved to be unpopular due to the King's portrait being of poor quality. Although it is claimed the denomination was misspelled (hapa haneri instead of hapa haneli), the spelling "Hapa Haneri" was correct until the end the 19th century. The spelling "Haneri" (Hawaiian for "Hundred") appears on all  and  Hawaiian bank notes in circulation between 1879 and 1900.

In 1883, Kingdom of Hawai'i official silver coinage were issued in the denominations of one dime (umi keneta in Hawaiian), quarter dollar (hapaha), half dollar (hapalua) and one dollar (akahi dala). 26 proof sets were struck by the Philadelphia Mint and contained the umi keneta, hapaha, hapalua, and akahi dala. 20 proof specimens in the denomination of an eighth dollar (hapawalu) were also struck. The Kingdom of Hawai'i desired to conform to the United States silver coinage denominations and selected the umi keneta over the hapawalu. The silver coins issued for circulation in the Kingdom was struck by the San Francisco Mint.

Hawaiian coins continued to circulate for several years after the 1898 annexation to the United States. In 1903, an act of Congress demonetized Hawaiian coins effective January 1st, 1904, and most were withdrawn and melted, with a sizable percentage of surviving examples made into jewelry. Following melting, the maximum number of each circulating coin that could possibly exist is as follows:

 Umi Keneta: 249,921
 Hapaha:     242,600
 Hapalua:     87,700
 Akahi Dala:  46,300

Banknotes
However, these notes were issued only in small numbers and US notes made up the bulk of circulating paper money.

In 1899, banknotes backed by gold deposits were issued in the same denominations. All Hawaiian notes, especially the gold certificates, are extremely rare today.

See also

 Coins of the Hawaiian dollar
 Hawaii overprint note

References

 Medcalf, Donald & Ronald Russell (1991). Hawaiian Money: Standard Catalog: Second Edition. Honolulu: Nani Stamp & Coin LTD. .

External links
Hawaii Paper Money

Modern obsolete currencies
Economy of Hawaii
1847 establishments in Hawaii
1898 disestablishments in Hawaii
19th-century economic history
1847 introductions